Régie Nationale des Postes is the company responsible for postal service in Burundi.

Previously a function of the Ministry of Transport, Posts and Telecommunications, it was reformed by decree number 100/021 of 7 March 1991, officially establishing the service as a separate entity on 1 January 1992.

See also

 Communications in Burundi

External links
Official Website (French)

Communications in Burundi
Logistics companies of Burundi
Burundi